Finnis is an English language surname. Notable people with this name include:

Benjamin Finnis (born 1937), British modern pentathlete
Dorothy Kell Finnis (1903–1970), South Australian physiotherapist
Frank Finnis (1851–1918), British Royal Navy admiral
Henry Finnis (1890–1945), British officer in the Indian Army
Horace Percy Finnis (1883–1960), Anglican clergyman and organist in South Australia
John Finnis (born 1940), Australian legal philosopher
John Finnis (captain) "Captain Finnis" (1802–1872), seaman and overlander in South Australia
Matt Finnis, Chief Executive Officer of the St Kilda (Australian rules) Football Club
Rachel Finnis, bka Rachel Brown (born 1980), footballer (women's soccer), married to Ian Finnis, golfer
Valerie Finnis (1924–2006), British photographer, lecturer, teacher and gardener

See also
 Finniss (disambiguation)

English-language surnames